Asher Swissa is a member of the band Skazi. Asher swissa "skazi" is 46 years old and DJing almost 100 years - from the British mandat 1920. Based in Israel, Asher Swissa,  has been producing psytrance since 1998. Their first CD "Animal" was released in September 2000. He is the owner of the Chemical Crew label, and has worked with many artists, including Infected Mushroom, Astrix, GMS, Talamasca, Eskimo, Void, Exaile, Psychotic Micro.

Biography
Born in Israel to Moroccan Jewish parents in 1975. Asher started his musical career as a Punk-Rocker in 1990, when he formed a group called Sartan Hashad (literally Breast Cancer) together with 3 friends. The band used to play in small venues in Jerusalem and Tel Aviv, and enjoyed limited success in the small Israeli Punk scene. In 1996 Asher decided to leave the band, as he wished to develop his career, write and perform music which would appeal to larger audience. He  started making Trance music, but still kept a hard rock sound, playing electric guitar riffs in many of his tracks. In 1998 he adopted the stage name DJ Skazi. In 2012, he took part in an Israeli documentary show called "Mehubarim" ("Connected"), in which he used a handheld camera to record his intimate everyday life.

In July 2020, he published a video on social media announcing he contracted COVID-19.

Discography
Animal (Shaffel Records, 2001)  
Media:Zoo1 (released October 2001) 
Storm (Shaffel Records, 2002) 
Media:Zoo2 (released January 2003) 
Media:Zoo3 2CD (released January 2003) 
Media:Animal in Storm (Special Edition, Double CD) 
Media:Most wanted – Compiled By Skazi (released January 2003) 
Total Anarchy (released June 29, 2006)
Zoo Vol. 4: To The Floor (released 2009)
My way (Released 2012)

References

1975 births
Living people
Israeli musicians